The 1946 College Conference of Illinois football season was the season of college football played by the member schools of the College Conference of Illinois (CCI) as part of the 1946 college football season. The CCI was formed in May 1946 and was a reorganization of the "Illinois College Conference" that had existed for the prior nine years.

The North Central Cardinals, in their first year under head coach Herb Heilman, won the CCI championship with a 7–1 record. Three teams tied for second place: the Wheaton Crusaders; Illinois Wesleyan Titans; and Lake Forest Foresters.

Conference overview

Team overviews

North Central

The 1946 North Central Cardinals football team represented North Central College of Naperville, Illinois, during the 1946 college football season. In their first season under head coach Herb Heilman, the Cardinals compiled a 7–1 record, won the CCI championship, and outscored opponents by a total of 148 to 22. The Cardinals' sole loss was by a 10-7 score against Lake Forest. It was North Central's first conference championship in 29 years.

Wheaton

The 1946 Wheaton Crusaders football team represented Wheaton College of Wheaton, Illinois, in the College Conference of Illinois during the 1946 college football season. In their third non-consecutive year under head coach Harvey Chrouser, the Crusaders compiled a 6–2 record (3–1 against CCI opponents), tied for second place in the CCI, and outscored opponent by a total of 146 to 33.

Illinois Wesleyan

Lake Forest

Augustana

James Millikin

Illinois College

Elmhurst

Carthage

References